Naruhito is a masculine Japanese given name. Notable people with the name include:

, 126th and current Emperor of Japan
, head of the imperial Kanin-no-miya household
, Japanese actor and voice actor

Japanese masculine given names